Charles Stennett Lamb (born 16 September 1972) is a former English cricketer.  Lamb was a right-handed batsman who bowled right-arm fast-medium.  He was born in Macclesfield, Cheshire.

Lamb made his debut for Cheshire in the 1993 Minor Counties Championship against Shropshire.  Lamb played Minor counties cricket for Cheshire from 1993 to 2001, including 40 Minor Counties Championship matches and 19 MCCA Knockout Trophy matches. In 1994, he made his List A debut against Durham in NatWest Trophy.  He played three further List A matches for Cheshire, the last of which came against Cornwall in the 2nd round of the 2002 Cheltenham & Gloucester Trophy which was played in 2001. In his four List A matches he took just 2 wickets at a bowling average of 59.50, with best figures of 2/16.

References

External links
Charles Lamb at ESPNcricinfo
Charles Lamb at CricketArchive

1972 births
Living people
Sportspeople from Macclesfield
People from Cheshire
English cricketers
Cheshire cricketers